"Crush" is a 1987 single by Grace Jones.

Background
The song was the third single from Grace Jones' album Inside Story, chosen for the North America whereas Europe opted for "Victor Should Have Been a Jazz Musician". The single was also released in an extended 12" version, yet to be released on CD, with "White Collar Crime" on the B-side.

Track listing
7" single
A. "Crush" – 3:22
B. "White Collar Crime" – 4:59

12" single
A. "Crush" (extended remix) – 8:09
B1. "Crush" (dub) – 6:21
B2. "White Collar Crime" – 4:59

12" promotional single
A. "Crush" (extended remix) – 8:09
B1. "Crush" (dub) – 6:21
B2. "Crush" (7" version) – 4:59

Chart performance

References

1987 singles
Grace Jones songs
Song recordings produced by Nile Rodgers
Songs written by Bruce Woolley
Songs written by Grace Jones
1986 songs
Manhattan Records singles
Freestyle music songs